The second Krišjānis Kariņš' cabinet (Latvian: Kariņa 2. ministru kabinets) is the 41st and current government of Latvia, sworn in on 14 December 2022 after Krišjānis Kariņš was proposed as Prime Minister by President Egils Levits and elected by the Saeima.

The government is a coalition between New Unity, National Alliance, and United List.

Composition

References

Government of Latvia
2022 establishments in Latvia
Cabinets established in 2022
Current governments